Sir James Sebastian Lamin Wood,  (born 6 April 1961), usually known by his middle name Sebastian, is a British diplomat who was the Ambassador to China from 2010 to 2015, and Ambassador to Germany from 2015 to 2020.

Career
Wood was educated at Emanuel School in London, then studied mathematics and philosophy at Magdalen College, Oxford, before joining the Foreign and Commonwealth Office (FCO) in 1983. He was posted to the British Embassy in Bangkok, Thailand; then was appointed as a First Secretary to the Sino-British Joint Liaison Group working on the transfer of sovereignty over Hong Kong.

In 2002, while posted as a Counsellor at the British Embassy in Washington DC, he was appointed Companion of the Order of St Michael and St George (CMG).

Ambassador to China
In 2010, he was granted his first ambassadorship as British Ambassador to China. He was appointed Knight Commander of the Order of St Michael and St George (KCMG) in the 2014 Birthday Honours for services to British prosperity and British interests in China.

Ambassador to Germany
In July 2015 the FCO announced that Wood was to become British Ambassador to Germany in September 2015.

In July 2020 it was announced that he would retire from the Diplomatic Service in November, and be succeeded by Jill Gallard as Ambassador to Germany.

Personal life
Wood is married to Sirinat Wood, a Thai, and has one son and three daughters.

References

1961 births
Living people
Ambassadors of the United Kingdom to China
Ambassadors of the United Kingdom to Germany
Knights Commander of the Order of St Michael and St George
Alumni of Magdalen College, Oxford
People educated at Emanuel School